A nasal vowel is a vowel that is produced with a lowering of the soft palate (or velum) so that the air flow escapes through the nose and the mouth simultaneously, as in the French vowel  or Amoy []. By contrast, oral vowels are produced without nasalization.

Nasalized vowels are vowels under the influence of neighbouring sounds. For instance, the [] of the word hand is affected by the following nasal consonant. In most languages, vowels adjacent to nasal consonants are produced partially or fully with a lowered velum in a natural process of assimilation and are therefore technically nasal, but few speakers would notice. That is the case in English: vowels preceding nasal consonants are nasalized, but there is no phonemic distinction between nasal and oral vowels, and all vowels are considered phonemically oral.

The nasality of nasal vowels, however, is a distinctive feature of certain languages. In other words, a language may contrast oral vowels and nasalized vowels phonemically. Linguists make use of minimal pairs to decide whether or not the nasality is of linguistic importance. In French, for instance, nasal vowels are distinct from oral vowels, and words can differ by the vowel quality. The words beau   "beautiful" and bon  "good" are a minimal pair that contrasts primarily the vowel nasalization even if the /ɔ̃/ from bon is slightly more open.

Portuguese allows nasal diphthongs, which contrast with their oral counterparts, like the pair mau  "bad" and mão  "hand".

Although there are French loanwords into English with nasal vowels like croissant [], there is no expectation that an English-speaker would nasalize the vowels to the same extent as French-speakers or Portuguese-speakers. Likewise, pronunciation keys in English dictionaries do not always indicate nasalization of French or Portuguese loanwords.

Influence on vowel height
Nasalization as a result of the assimilation of a nasal consonant tends to cause a raising of vowel height; phonemically distinctive nasalization tends to lower the vowel. According to a different assessment, high vowels do tend to be lowered, but low vowels tend to be raised instead.

In most languages, vowels of all heights are nasalized indiscriminately, but preference occurs in some language, such as for high vowels in Chamorro and low vowels in Thai.

Degree of nasalization
A few languages, such as Palantla Chinantec, contrast lightly nasalized and heavily nasalized vowels. They may be contrasted in print by doubling the IPA diacritic for nasalization:  vs . Bickford & Floyd (2006) combine the tilde with the ogonek:  vs . (The ogonek is sometimes used in an otherwise IPA transcription to avoid conflict with tone diacritics above the vowels.)

Origin
Rodney Sampson described a three-stage historical account, explaining the origin of nasal vowels in modern French. The notation of Terry and Webb will be used below, where V, N, and Ṽ (with a tilde above) represent oral vowel, nasal consonant, and nasal vowel, respectively.

In the Old French period, vowels become nasalized under the regressive assimilation, as VN > ṼN. In the Middle French period, the realization of the nasal consonant became variable, as VN > Ṽ(N). As the language evolves into its modern form, the consonant is no longer realized, as ṼN > Ṽ.

Orthography
Languages written with Latin script may indicate nasal vowels by a trailing silent n or m, as is the case in French, Portuguese, Lombard (central classic orthography), Bamana, Breton, and Yoruba.

In other cases, they are indicated by diacritics. In the International Phonetic Alphabet, nasal vowels are denoted by a tilde over the symbol for the vowel. The same practice can be found in Portuguese marking with a tilde in diphthongs (e.g. põe) and for words ending in /ɐ̃/ (e.g. manhã, irmã). While the tilde is also used for this purpose in Paraguayan Guaraní, phonemic nasality is indicated by a diaeresis ( ¨ ) in the standardized orthographies of most varieties of Tupí-Guaraní spoken in Bolivia. Polish, Navajo, and Elfdalian use a hook under the letter, called an ogonek, as in ą, ę. The Pe̍h-ōe-jī romanization of Taiwanese Hokkien and Amoy uses a superscript n (aⁿ, eⁿ, ...).

The Brahmic scripts used for most Indic languages mark nasalization with the anusvāra (ं, homophonically used for homorganic nasalization in a consonant cluster following the vowel) or the anunāsika (ँ) diacritic (and its regional variants).

Nasalized vowels occur in Classical Arabic but not in contemporary speech or Modern Standard Arabic. There is no orthographic way to denote the nasalization, but it is systematically taught as part of the essential rules of tajwid, used to read the Qur'an. Nasalization occurs in recitation, usually when a final nūn is followed by a yāʾ.

Languages
The following languages use phonemic nasal vowels:

See also
 Nasalization
 Vowel
front vowel
back vowel

References

Further reading
de Medeiros, Beatriz Raposo. (2011). Nasal Coda and Vowel Nasality in Brazilian Portuguese. In S. M. Alvord (Ed.), Selected Proceedings of the 5th Conference on Laboratory Approaches to Romance Phonology (pp. 33–45).
Hajek, John & Maeda, Shinji. (2000). Investigating Universals of Sound Change: the Effect of Vowel Height and Duration on the Development of Distinctive Nasalization. Papers in Laboratory Phonology V: Acquisition and the lexicon (pp. 52–69).
Jeong, Sunwoo. (2012). Directional asymmetry in nasalization: Aperceptual account. Studies in Phonetics, Phonology and Morphology, 18(3), 437–469.
Michaud, A., Jacques, G., & Rankin, R. L. (2012). Historical transfer of nasality between consonantal onset and vowel: from C to V or from V to C? Diachronica, 29(2), 201–230.
Sampson, Rodney. (1999). Nasal Vowel Evolution in Romance. Oxford University Press.

Vowels
Vowel